Akinade Moses Ibukun (born 12 February 2001) is a Nigerian footballer who plays as a centre-forward for Egyptian club Tala'ea El Gaish.

Club career
Akinade started playing as a senior for Ebedei in 2016.
On 1 January 2018, Akinade joined Nigeria Professional Football League side  Heartland F.C.

Northern Cyprus
Akindate joined Binatlı Yılmaz S.K. in the 2019-2020 summer transfer window.

Bahrain
After a Qatar deal fell out, he joined Bahrain SC  for a period of two-year.

References

External links
 Akinade Moses Ibukun at KTFF.org

Living people
2001 births
Association football forwards
Nigerian footballers
Nigeria Professional Football League players
Nigerian expatriate footballers
Heartland F.C. players
Expatriate footballers in Northern Cyprus